Mtime may refer to:

st_mtime, a file's last modification time, part of the stat() in Unix
Mtime.com, Chinese film website